Studia Albanica is a biannual scientific journal published by the Social and Albanological Studies Section of the Academy of Sciences of Albania. It was established in 1964. It covers Albanology, including studies on the Albanian language and literature, and history. The articles are published in their original language, although French is used by its editorial staff. The editor-in-chief is Seit Mansaku.

See also
Centre of Albanological Studies
Gjurmime Albanologjike
List of magazines in Albania

References

1964 establishments in Albania
Academy of Sciences of Albania
Area studies journals
Biannual journals
Publications established in 1964
Multilingual journals
Albanian studies